The Richmond Raiders were a professional indoor football team located in Richmond, Virginia the Richmond Coliseum as their home arena. The Raiders began play in the 2010 as an expansion team of the American Indoor Football Association (AIFA). The Raiders moved to the Southern Indoor Football League (SIFL) when the Eastern Division of the AIFA merged with the SIFL in the winter of 2010, beginning SIFL play in the 2011 season. After just a single season in the SIFL the Raiders, along with four other members of the SIFL, became the charter members of the Professional Indoor Football League (PIFL). The team was then a member the PIFL from 2012 to 2015.

History

In July, 2009, the American Indoor Football Association announced that they would be expanding into Richmond, Virginia. After a month-long name-the-team contest, the Richmond franchise announced that it would be nicknamed the Raiders on August 5, 2009. On October 12, 2009, the Raiders officially unveiled their new logo.

The Raiders' first game was the 2010 AIFA Kickoff Classic; on January 23, 2010, where they played an exhibition game against the AIFA All-Stars at the Richmond Coliseum.

On May 5, 2010, defensive coordinator Charles Gunnings replaced Mike Siani as the head coach, as Siani resigned.

Chris Simpson became the head coach of the Raiders for the 2011 season, coming over from the Baltimore Mariners on September 13, 2010. Even more change came about for the 2011 season, as the AIFA announced an merger with the Southern Indoor Football League (SIFL). In February, 2011, Simpson resigned before opening day, as he "relocated to Texas to pursue family business opportunities".  He was replaced by James Fuller, who was the interim head coach for the Arena Football League's Dallas Vigilantes in 2010.

Former Richmond Revolution head coach Steve Criswell signed with the Raiders as a senior consultant for the 2011 season. Criswell brought several former Revolution players along, including QB Bryan Randall and DL Lawrence Lewis.

The 2012 season saw the Raiders move to the just formed Professional Indoor Football League (PIFL).

After starting the season with a 2-4 record, the Raiders rallied to win their final six games to clinch the #2 seed in the PIFL playoffs. After a 54-35 victory over the Nashville Venom in the opening round of the PIFL playoffs, the Raiders advanced to PIFL IV against the Columbus Lions. The Raiders were defeated 38-64.

After the 2015 season, and due to turmoil in the lower levels of indoor football, the Raiders announced that they would take the 2016 season off, as there was no league within reasonable geographic distance that the team's ownership felt comfortable joining. In summer 2016, the ownership announced that Raiders would not be returning and they would continue to focus on their sports performance training business.

Players

Final roster

Awards and honors
The following is a list of all Raiders players who won league awards:

Head coaches

Season-by-season results

References

External links 
 Official website
 Raiders' 2011 stats

 
2008 establishments in Virginia
2015 disestablishments in Virginia
Viking Age in popular culture